Sulfuric acid poisoning refers to ingestion of sulfuric acid, found in lead-acid batteries and some metal cleaners, pool cleaners,  drain cleaners and anti-rust products.

Signs and symptoms
 Brown to black streak from angle of mouth
 Brown to black vomitus
 Brown to black stomach wall
 Black swollen tongue
 White (chalky white) teeth
 Blotting paper appearance of stomach mucosa
 Ulceration of esophagus (fibrosis and stricture)
 Perforation of stomach.
 The stomach resembles a black spongy mass on post mortem

Treatment
For superficial injuries, washing (therapeutic irrigation) is important. Emergency treatments include protecting the airway, which might involve a tracheostomy. Further treatment will vary depending on the severity, but might include investigations to determine the extent of damage (bronchoscopy for the airways and endoscopy for the gastrointestinal tract), followed by treatments including surgery (to debride and repair) and intravenous fluids.

Gastric lavage is contraindicated in corrosive acid poisoning like sulfuric acid poisoning. Bicarbonate is also contraindicated as it liberates carbon dioxide which can cause gastric dilatation leading to rupture of stomach.

Society and culture
Vitriolage is the act of throwing sulfuric acid or other corrosive acids on somebody's face.

References

External links 

 Sulphuric acid: Toxicological overview
 Sulfuric acid poisoning on Penn Medicine
 Sulfuric acid poisoning on Medline Plus

Toxic effects of substances chiefly nonmedicinal as to source
Chemical weapons attacks